Treyford is a hamlet and Anglican parish in the Chichester district of West Sussex, England. It lies within the civil parish of Elsted and Treyford.

History
Treyford (Treverde) was listed in the Domesday Book (1086) in the ancient hundred of Dumpford as having 21 households: eight villagers, eight smallholders and five slaves; with ploughing land, woodland, meadows and a mill, it had a value to the lord of the manor of £5.4. The lord of the manor was Robert, son of Theobald.

Parish church
The old parish church of St Mary, according to Kelly's Directory of 1867 

Kelly's continues: 

The ruins of the old church are a listed building.

See also
Devil's Jumps, Treyford
Treyford to Bepton Down

References

External links

Further historical information and sources on GENUKI

Villages in West Sussex